Movies for the ImaginAsian is a show on the ImaginAsian television network showcasing East Asian and South Asian films.

External links
ImaginAsian page

Asian-American mass media